Virginia Satir (26 June 1916 – 10 September 1988) was an American author and psychotherapist, recognized for her approach to family therapy. Her pioneering work in the field of family reconstruction therapy honored her with the title "Mother of Family Therapy". Her most well-known books are Conjoint Family Therapy, 1964, Peoplemaking, 1972, and The New Peoplemaking, 1988.

She is also known for creating the Virginia Satir Change Process Model, a psychological model developed through clinical studies.  Change management and organizational gurus of the 1990s and 2000s embrace this model to define how change impacts organizations.

Early years

Virginia Satir was born on June 26, 1916, in Neillsville, Wisconsin. She was the eldest of five children born to Oscar Alfred Reinnard Pagenkopf and Minnie Happe Pagenkopf.  When she was five years old, Satir suffered from appendicitis.  Her mother, a devout Christian Scientist, refused to take her to a doctor. By the time Satir's father decided to overrule his wife, the young girl's appendix had ruptured.  Doctors were able to save her life, but Satir was forced to stay in the hospital for several months.

When Satir was three years old, she taught herself to read and by age nine, she had read all of the books in the library of her small one-room school. 
From early years, Satir demonstrated an interest in family dynamics. When she was five, she decided that she would grow up to be "a children's detective on parents, inclinations that would later become true through her therapeutic practices." She later explained that "I didn't quite know what I would look for, but I realized a lot went on in families that didn't meet the eye."

In 1929, her mother insisted that the family move from their farm to Milwaukee so that Satir could attend high school. Satir's high school years coincided with the Great Depression, and to help her family she took a part-time job and also attended as many courses as she could so that she could graduate early.  In 1932, she received her high school diploma and promptly enrolled in Milwaukee State Teachers College (now University of Wisconsin–Milwaukee.)  To pay for her education she worked part-time for the Works Projects Administration and for Gimbels Department Store and further supplemented her income by babysitting. She graduated with a bachelor's degree in education, and worked as a teacher for a few years.

During her time as a schoolteacher, she recognized that involved and supportive parents not only help students in the classroom but could also heal family dynamics. Satir began meeting and cooperating with the parents of her students and saw the family system as a reflection of the
world at large, stating “if we can heal the family, we can heal the world”

Beginning in 1937, for three summers she took courses at Northwestern University in Chicago. Her interest in families led her to enroll full-time at the University of Chicago School of Social Services Administration where she obtained a master's degree in social work. She finished her coursework for her master's degree in 1943, and completed her thesis for her degree in 1948.

Career as a therapist
After graduating social work school, Satir began working in private practice. She met with her first family in 1951, and by 1955 was working with Illinois Psychiatric Institute, encouraging other therapists to focus on families instead of individual patients. By the end of the decade she had moved to California, where she cofounded the Mental Research Institute (MRI) in Palo Alto, California. MRI received a grant from NIMH in 1962, allowing them to begin the first formal family therapy training program ever offered; Satir was hired as its Training Director.

Innovation

Satir's skills and views about the important role the family has and its connection to an individual's problems and/or healing process, led her into becoming a renowned therapist.
One of Satir's most novel ideas at the time, was that the "presenting issue" or "surface problem" itself was seldom the real problem; rather, how people coped with the issue created the problem." Satir also offered insights into the particular problems that low self-esteem could cause in relationships.  In addition to Satir’s influence in human sciences, she helped establish organizations with the purpose of educating therapists around the world and granting them with resources to help families and clients.

Long interested in the idea of networking, Satir founded two groups to help individuals find mental health workers or other people who were suffering from similar issues to their own. In 1970, she organized "Beautiful People," which later became known as the "International Human Learning Resources Network." In 1977 she founded the Avanta Network, which was renamed to the Virginia Satir Global Network in 2010.

Recognition

Two years later, Satir was appointed to the Steering Committee of the International Family Therapy Association and became a member of the advisory board for the National Council for Self-Esteem.

She has also been recognized with several honorary doctorates, including a 1978 doctorate in Social Sciences from the University of Wisconsin–Madison.

Honors and awards received
 1976 Awarded Gold Medal of "Outstanding and Consistent Service to Mankind" by the University of Chicago.
 1978 Awarded honorary doctorate in Social Sciences from the University of Wisconsin–Madison.
 1982 Selected by the West German Government as one of the twelve most influential leaders in the world today.
 1985 Time magazine quotes a colleague, “She can fill any auditorium in the country”, after her stellar contribution to the Evolution of Psychotherapy Conference in Phoenix, Arizona.
 1985 Selected by the prestigious National Academy of Practice as one of two members to advise on health concerns to the Congress of the United States.
 1986 Selected as member of the International Council of Elders, a society developed by the recipients of the Nobel Peace Prize.
 1987 Named Honorary Member of the Czechoslovakian Medical Society.
 She was honored in the California Social Work Hall of Distinction.
 In two national surveys of Psychiatrists, Psychologists, Social Workers, and Marriage and Family Therapists, she was voted the most influential therapist.

Work and influence
Satir's entire work was done under the umbrella of "Becoming More Fully Human". From the possibility of a nurturing primary triad of father, mother, and child she conceived a process of Human Validation. She viewed the reconciliation of families as a way to reconcile the world. As she said (Align, 1988, p. 20): "The family is a microcosm. By knowing how to heal the family, I know how to heal the world." With this overview she established professional training groups in the Satir Model in the Middle East, the Orient, Western and Eastern Europe, Central and Latin America, and Russia. The Institute for International Connections, Avanta Network, and the International Human Learning Resources Network are concrete examples of teaching people how to connect with one another and then extend the connections. Her world impact could be summed up in her universal mantra: peace within, peace between, peace among.

In the mid-1970s her work was extensively studied by the co-founders of Neuro-linguistic programming (NLP), Richard Bandler and John Grinder, who used it as one of the three fundamental models of NLP.  Bandler and Grinder also collaborated with Satir to author Changing With Families for Science and Behavior Books, which bore the subtitle 'A Book About Further Education for Being Human'. The Virginia Satir Global Network, originally named "AVANTA" by Satir, is an international organization that carries on her work and promotes her approach to family therapy.

In 1984, Satir encouraged marriage and family therapists to shift their focus to relationship education:

Steve Andreas, one of Bandler and Grinder's students, wrote Virginia Satir: The Patterns of Her Magic (1991) in which he summarized the major patterns of Satir's work, and then showed how Satir applied them in a richly annotated verbatim transcript of a videotaped session titled "Forgiving Parents". In this session, Satir works with a woman who hated her mother, and had difficulty connecting with others as a result. Using a variety of role-plays, including a "family reconstruction", this woman came to see her mother as her "best friend", as detailed in a 3½ year follow-up interview.
She died in 1988 of pancreatic cancer.

Process of Change Model

Another of Satir's work that would have lasting impacts on many fields is the Process of Change model. This model illustrates how individuals go through change and how they can cope with such change to improve their relationship with each other. The Process of Change Model is divided into four stages: late status quo, chaos, practice and integration, and new status quo.

In the first stage of change, the late status quo, Satir argued the individual is in a predictable environment. Status quo involves a set routine, fixed ideas about the world, and an established behavior. This stage is all about predictability and familiarity.

The second stage of change is chaos. Chaos, as described by Satir, occurs when something in the environment or in the individual changes. This change brings a sense of unfamiliarity and the previously stable routine can no longer be held. In the stage of chaos, here are many strong feelings like sadness, fear, confusion, stress, among others. Satir argues that in the change stage of chaos, therapists must help families and individuals navigate these emotions. Additionally, chaos is important because it brings out creativity in individuals to find solutions.

The third stage of change is practice and integration. In this stage new ideas are being implemented and individuals are figuring out what
works best. Like any other skill, it requires patience and practice.

The final stage of change is the new status quo. In this stage, the new ideas, behaviors, and changes are not so new anymore. Individuals tend to acclimate to the change, figure out what works, and become better at their new skill.

Satir points out that this change process is not linear. On some occasions, individuals might have found a temporal coping skill or solution but if it doesn't bring the desired results, they might regress to the stage of chaos. For this reason, it is important that therapists are aware of this process to help guide their clients.

Career as author
Satir published her first book, Conjoint Family Therapy, in 1964, developed from the training manual she wrote for students at MRI. Her reputation grew with each subsequent book, and she travelled the world to speak on her methods. She also became a Diplomate of the Academy of Certified Social Workers and received the American Association for Marriage and Family Therapy's Distinguished Service Award.

Satir often integrated meditations and poetic writing into both her public workshops and writings. One of her most well-known works, "I Am Me," was written by Satir in response to a question posed by an angry teenage girl.

I Am Me

Bibliography
 
 
 
 
 
 
 
 
 
 
 Englander-Golden; P; Satir, V. Say It Straight: From Compulsions to Choices, Science and Behavior Books, Palo Alto, CA 1991.

See also
 Family systems therapy
 Carl Whitaker
 Sally Pierone
 Systems psychology

References

Further reading

External links

http://satir.web.unc.edu/about-virginia-satir/
 Obituary in the Los Angeles Times, Sept. 12, 1988
 https://totallyhistory.com/virginia-satir/. Brief biography at Webster 
 https://open.spotify.com/episode/7nzosMGWIenlTOjn38gp6m?si=a553cbc591a84c38
University
 The Virginia Satir Global Network
 Satir Institute of the Pacific
 Say It Straight Foundation

American social workers
Social workers
American psychotherapists
Family therapists
20th-century American non-fiction writers
20th-century American women writers
American self-help writers
Northwestern University alumni
University of Wisconsin–Milwaukee alumni
1916 births
1988 deaths
American women non-fiction writers
Deaths from cancer in California
Deaths from pancreatic cancer